The 2013 Middle Tennessee Blue Raiders football team represented Middle Tennessee State University as a member of the East Division of Conference USA (C-USA) during the 2013 NCAA Division I FBS football season. Led by eighth-year head coach Rick Stockstill, the Blue Raiders compiled an overall record of 8–5 with a mark 6–2 in conference play to tie for second place in C-USA's East Division. Middle Tennessee was invited to the Armed Forces Bowl, where they lost to Navy. The team played home games at Johnny "Red" Floyd Stadium in Murfreesboro, Tennessee. This was Middle Tennessee first year as a member of C-USA after leaving the Sun Belt Conference.

Schedule

Game summaries

Western Carolina

at North Carolina

Memphis

at Florida Atlantic

at BYU

East Carolina

at North Texas

Marshall

at UAB

FIU

at Southern Miss

UTEP

Navy–Armed Forces Bowl

References

Middle Tennessee
Middle Tennessee Blue Raiders football seasons
Middle Tennessee Blue Raiders football